Seira is a municipality located in the Ribagorza comarca, province of Huesca, Aragon, Spain. According to the 2018 census the municipality has a population of 150 inhabitants. Its postal code is 22463.

The town is located on the left side of the Ésera River in a very mountainous place.

References

External links

 Information on Seira

 auto

Municipalities in the Province of Huesca